AOR may refer to:

Entertainment
 Adult-oriented rock (disambiguation)
 Arena rock, a style of commercially oriented rock music
 Album-oriented rock, an American FM radio format
 AOR – Spirit of The Alarm, band
 Arab on Radar, an American noise rock band
 AOR (performance), a 1971 performance by Jean-Michel Jarre at the Paris Opera

Companies and organizations
 Advocates for Opioid Recovery
 Aliquippa & Ohio River Railroad, in Aliquippa, Pennsylvania, United States
 AOR (company) (Authority on Radio Communications, Ltd.), a Japanese manufacturer of radio equipment
 Auckland One Rail, in Auckland, New Zealand

Other uses
 Agent of record, an insurance term
 Architect of Record, the architecture firm that prepares the construction documents for a new building project
 Agency of record, an advertising term
 Aor, a pen name of R. A. Schwaller de Lubicz (1887–1961)
 AOR, a type of ship; the former US Navy hull classification for a replenishment oiler
 AOR, the IATA airport code for Sultan Abdul Halim Airport, Malaysia
 Aorist, a grammatical aspect of some Indo-European languages, abbreviated "aor."
 App-o-rama, a strategy of completing multiple financial account applications in a short period of time
 Area of responsibility, a United States military acronym referring to the geographic region assigned to a strategic military command
 Atlantic Ocean Region, a part of the Tracking and Data Relay Satellite System
 Sperata aor, a catfish of family Bagridae
 Aur Island in Malaysia, also spelled "Aor"
Adjusted Odds Ratio, an odds ratio that controls for multiple predictor variables in a statistical model